The archbishop of Adelaide is the diocesan bishop of the Anglican Diocese of Adelaide, Australia and ex officio metropolitan bishop of the ecclesiastical Province of South Australia.

List of bishops and archbishops of Adelaide
References

External links

 – official site

 
Lists of Anglican bishops and archbishops
Anglican bishops of Adelaide